Jiang Jianchun (born 9 February 1955) is a Chinese forestry engineer who is a researcher at the Institute of Forest Chemical Industry, Chinese Academy of Forestry Sciences, and an academician of the Chinese Academy of Engineering.

Biography 
Jiang was born in Liyang County, Jiangsu, on 9 February 1955. After graduating from East China University of Science and Technology in January 1980, he was despatched to the Chinese Academy of Forestry Sciences.

He is now a researcher and doctoral supervisor at the Institute of Forest Chemical Industry.

Honours and awards 
 2013 State Science and Technology Progress Award (Second Class)
 2016 State Science and Technology Progress Award (Second Class)
 27 November 2017 Member of the Chinese Academy of Engineering (CAE)

References 

1955 births
Living people
People from Liyang
Engineers from Jiangsu
East China University of Science and Technology alumni
Members of the Chinese Academy of Engineering